Apatomyces is a fungal genus  in the family Laboulbeniaceae. A monotypic genus, Apatomyces contains the single species Apatomyces laboulbenioides.

See also
List of Laboulbeniaceae genera

References

Laboulbeniomycetes
Monotypic Laboulbeniales genera